Damian Rhodes (born May 28, 1969) is an American former professional ice hockey goaltender. Rhodes played for the  Toronto Maple Leafs, Ottawa Senators, and Atlanta Thrashers over eleven National Hockey League (NHL) seasons. He became the first player in Thrashers' franchise history when he was acquired in June 1999.

Playing career

High school
Rhodes was born in St. Paul, Minnesota.  While attending Richfield Senior High School, he played goaltender for the high school varsity team, Richfield Spartans, during his Junior and Senior years.  In his Junior year, he and fellow goal tender Jon Lee shared goaltending on the team.  One of the highlights of that year was an upset win against Richfield's arch-rival, the Edina Hornets.  The Edina Hornets that year had only lost a single game during the regular season and had beaten Richfield twice.  In the Section 6 quarter final game against Edina, Rhodes stopped 36 of 39 shots on goal and Richfield had won the upset game 4-3.  In the following Section 6 final game against the Minnetonka Skippers, Rhodes only allowed a single goal in a 2-1 victory and gave the Richfield Spartans a berth in the Minnesota State High School Hockey Championship.

Toronto Maple Leafs
Rhodes was drafted by the Toronto Maple Leafs in the 6th round of the 1987 Entry Draft, 112th overall. After being drafted by the Maple Leafs, Rhodes attended Michigan Tech University, where he posted a 37-49-1 record over three seasons with the Huskies. While at Michigan Tech, Rhodes was credited with scoring a goal in a game on January 21, 1989.

Rhodes made his NHL debut on March 22, 1992 as he was called up from the Newmarket Saints of the American Hockey League near the end of the season. Rhodes showed some potential in a 3-1 victory over the Detroit Red Wings.

Rhodes spent the next couple seasons with the St. John's Maple Leafs, before serving as a backup to Felix Potvin from the 1993–94 season to 1995–96.

In an effort to secure a full-time starting job, Rhodes was traded on January 23, 1996 in a three-way deal between the Maple Leafs, Ottawa Senators and New York Islanders that saw him and fellow players Kirk Muller, Don Beaupre, Ken Belanger and Martin Straka, along with the rights to Wade Redden and Bryan Berard (both of whom were the top two picks in the 1995 NHL Entry Draft) move between the three teams.

Ottawa Senators
Rhodes was established as the Sens starting goaltender shortly after the trade. He posted a 10-22-4 record, which was largely in part to playing in front of a shaky defensive corps. His solid play however, led him to being considered the Senators goalie of the future.

Rhodes split goaltending duties with Ron Tugnutt during his first full season with the team, with Rhodes starting the majority of the team's games. Rhodes posted a 14-20-4 record with a 2.72 GAA in 50 games. Rhodes served as the team's backup in the franchise's first ever playoff series against the Buffalo Sabres, in which he saw no action.

Rhodes gained notoriety in 1998. Rhodes had a 13-17-5 record and a 2.23 GAA at the time, and opted to dye his hair blonde as a way to change his fortunes. Following the change, Rhodes posted a 10-4-2 record, lowering his GAA to 1.81. Rhodes' momentum carried into the 1998 Stanley Cup playoffs as he outplayed Martin Brodeur and was instrumental in the team's first round upset over the New Jersey Devils, which was the first playoff series victory for the Senators franchise. Rhodes' momentum would evaporate in the next round, as the Senators were defeated in five games by the Washington Capitals.

Rhodes is one of thirteen goaltenders in NHL history to score a goal, managing the task without taking a shot. Rhodes was the last player to touch the puck on a delayed penalty call when Lyle Odelein of the New Jersey Devils inadvertently put the puck in his own goal with Martin Brodeur out of the net for an extra attacker in Ottawa's 6–0 victory on January 2, 1999.

Rhodes' lack of playing time near the end of the 1998-99 season, led to Tugnutt establishing himself as the team's starting goaltender down the stretch. Rhodes' salary and tendency to allow soft goals made him expendable. Rather than lose him to the Atlanta Thrashers in the expansion draft, the Senators traded Rhodes to the Thrashers on June 18, 1999 in exchange for future considerations. Rhodes would become the first player acquired by the Thrashers franchise.

Atlanta Thrashers
Rhodes was established as the Thrashers starting goaltender following the trade, but his first season with the team was a forgettable one. He started the season posting a 3-7-2 record, before missing 49 games with a sprained ankle. Rhodes returned to the lineup, but posted a 2-12-1 record upon returning from injury.
Rhodes had the distinction of recording both the franchise's first win, road win and shutout in a 2-0 defeat of the New York Islanders on October 14, 1999.

Rhodes would continue to struggle with injuries over the course of his tenure with the Thrashers posting a record of 7-19-7 record during the 2000-01 season, missing significant time due to injuries to his knee and shoulder. Rhodes' struggle to stay healthy cost him the team's goaltending job to Milan Hnilicka, who played well in his absence.

Rhodes final season for Atlanta came during the 2001–02 season, as he again struggled to stay in the Thrashers lineup, missing significant time due to injuries. Rhodes finished the season with a 2-10-1 record and a 3.67 GAA over 15 games.

Due to his injuries and inconsistent play over his three years with the team, Rhodes' days in Atlanta were numbered after the Thrashers drafted Finnish goaltender Kari Lehtonen with the second overall pick in the 2002 NHL Entry Draft and opted to go forward with the tandem of Hnilicka and Finnish prospect Pasi Nurminen the following season. Rhodes was bought out of his contract on July 4, 2002, posting a dismal record of 14-48-11 over three seasons.

With limited interest in the free agent market, Rhodes attempted to revive his career by signing with the Greenville Grrrowl of the ECHL for the 2002-03 season. Rhodes would play 12 games for Greenville that season, going 2-8-2 and earning 1 shutout.

Rhodes finished his NHL career with a 99-140-48 record in 309 games over 10 NHL seasons with three franchises.

Personal life
In 2005, Rhodes married TV host Amanda Jahn. They have two children and reside in Cleveland, Ohio.

Rhodes was previously married to Canadian actress Lara Wickes from 1997 to 1999. Rhodes and Wickes met in 1994, when they both resided in a Toronto area apartment, when he was a member of the Toronto Maple Leafs.

Rhodes was known for his eccentricities during his tenure with the Senators, such as refusing to change his goalie pads to ones with the team's colors following his mid-season acquisition in 1996, bleaching his hair blonde and opting to stay in Ottawa area hotels on game days in order to keep his focus.

Career statistics

Regular season and playoffs

International

References

External links
 

1969 births
Living people
American men's ice hockey goaltenders
Atlanta Thrashers players
Greenville Grrrowl players
Ice hockey people from Saint Paul, Minnesota
Lowell Lock Monsters players
Michigan Tech Huskies men's ice hockey players
National Hockey League goaltenders who have scored in a game
Newmarket Saints players
Ottawa Senators players
St. John's Maple Leafs players
Toronto Maple Leafs draft picks
Toronto Maple Leafs players